Pleocoma badia is a species of rain beetle in the family Pleocomidae. It is found in North America.

Subspecies
These two subspecies belong to the species Pleocoma badia:
 Pleocoma badia badia Fall, 1917
 Pleocoma badia hirsuta Davis, 1934

References

Further reading

 

scarabaeiformia
Articles created by Qbugbot
Beetles described in 1917